Smiliini is a tribe of treehoppers in the family Membracidae. There are about 6 genera and at least 40 described species in Smiliini.

Genera
These six genera belong to the tribe Smiliini:
 Atymna Stål, 1867 c g b
 Cyrtolobus Goding, 1894 c g b
 Grandolobus Ball, 1932 c g b
 Ophiderma Fairmaire, 1847 c g b
 Smilia Germar, 1833 c g b
 Xantholobus Van Duzee, 1908 c g b
Data sources: i = ITIS, c = Catalogue of Life, g = GBIF, b = Bugguide.net

References

Further reading

External links

 

Hemiptera tribes
Smiliinae